The 1991 Langbaurgh by-election was a by-election held on 7 November 1991 for the British House of Commons constituency of Langbaurgh, in the former county of Cleveland in North East England. It was the final by-election of the 1987-1992 parliament, and was held just five months before the 1992 general election.

The seat had become vacant on the death of the Conservative Member of Parliament Richard Holt on 20 September 1991. Holt had held the seat since the 1983 general election.

The by-election was won by the Labour candidate, Ashok Kumar. It was held on the same day as a by-election in Kincardine and Deeside, which the Conservatives also lost.

Votes

Previous result

See also 
 Langbaurgh (UK Parliament constituency)
 List of United Kingdom by-elections

References 

By-elections to the Parliament of the United Kingdom in Yorkshire and the Humber constituencies
1991 in England
1991 elections in the United Kingdom
1990s in North Yorkshire
Cleveland, England